Fritz Gäbler (12 January 1897 – 26 March 1974) was an East German communist politician. 
In 1932, he was a representative in the Thuringia state parliament. Gäbler was imprisoned for most of the Nazi era, having been one of the first prisoners in Nohra concentration camp. In 1987 he was commemorated by having a stamp designed with his face on it, in East Germany.

References

See also
Kurt Seibt

Socialist Unity Party of Germany politicians
1897 births
1974 deaths